Trollius asiaticus, the Asian globeflower, is an ornamental plant of the family Ranunculaceae, which is native to Asia and Europe. This plant usually grows in wet places, especially in grasslands and forests. It commonly grows to about 20 cm or higher.

References

External links
Trollius  asiaticus (photo)
Trollius  asiaticus (photo)
Trollius  asiaticus (photo)

asiaticus
Flora of China
Flora of Europe
Garden plants
Plants described in 1753
Taxa named by Carl Linnaeus